The Prayer (La prière) is a 1909 sculpture by Auguste Rodin. As in his The Walking Man, he explores a fragment of a figure.

Casts
One of the bronze casts of the work is now in the Museo Soumaya in Mexico City.

See also
List of sculptures by Auguste Rodin

References

External links

Sculptures by Auguste Rodin
1909 sculptures
Sculptures of the Museo Soumaya
Bronze sculptures in Mexico